Severo Sarduy (February 25, 1937 – June 8, 1993) was a Cuban poet, author, playwright, and critic of Cuban literature and art. Some of his works deal explicitly with male homosexuality and transvestism.

Biography
Born in a working-class family of Spanish, African, and Chinese heritage, Sarduy was the top student in his high school, in Camagüey, and in 1956  moved to Havana, where he began a study of medicine.  With the triumph of the Cuban revolution he collaborated with the Diario libre and Lunes de revolución, pro-Marxist papers.  In 1960 he traveled to Paris to study at the Ecole du Louvre.  There he was connected to the group of intellectuals who produced the magazine Tel Quel, particularly to philosopher François Wahl, with whom he was openly involved

Sarduy worked as a reader for Editions du Seuil and as editor and producer of the Radiodiffusion-Télévision Française. Sarduy decided not to return to Cuba when his scholarship ran out a year later. Disaffected with Castro's regime and fearful of its persecution of homosexuals and the censorship imposed on writers, Sarduy never went home.

In 1972 his novel Cobra won him the Medici Prize. He was among the most brilliant essayists writing in Spanish and "a powerful baroque narrator, full of surprising resources." As a poet, he was considered one of the greatest of his time. He was also a more or less secret painter; a major retrospective of his work was held at the Reina Sofía Museum of Madrid after his death.

He died due to complications from AIDS just after finishing his autobiographical work Pájaros de la playa (translated as Beach Birds by Suzanne Jill Levine and Carol Maier).
To this day, his writings are difficult to access for a Cuban audience, whereas his books are available to the French and international public.

Bibliography

Gestos. 1963. Novel
De donde son los cantantes. 1967
Escrito sobre un cuerpo. 1969. Essays
Flamenco. 1970. Poems.
Mood Indigo. 1970. Poems
La playa. 1971. Pieza radiofónica / radio play
La caída. 1971. Pieza radiofónica / radio play
Relato. 1971. Pieza radiofónica / radio play
Los matadores de Hormigas. 1971. Pieza radiofónica / radio play
Flamenco. 1971. Poems
Mood Indigo. 1971. Poems
Cobra. 1972. Novel
Barroco. 1974. Essays
Para la voz. 1977. Radio Plays ("La playa," La caida," Relato," and "Los matadores de Hormigas")
Big Bang. 1974. Poems
Maitreya. 1978. Novel
Daiquiri. 1980 . Poems
La simulación. 1982. Essay
Colibrí. 1984.  Novel
Un testigo fugaz y disfrazado. 1985 Poems
El cristo de la Rue Jacob.1987. Essays
Nueva inestabilidad. 1987. Essays
Ensayos generales sobre el barroco. 1987. Essays
Cocuyo.  1990.  Novel
Pájaros de la playa. 1993. Published posthumously just one month after his death.
Obra Completa, Two volumes. 1999. Edited by Francois Wahl. UNESCO. Paris.

References

Further reading
English
The name game: writing/fading writer in De donde son los cantantes / Oscar Montero. 1988
Severo Sarduy and the religion of the text / Rolando Pérez (Cuban poet), 1988
Orientalism in the Hispanic literary tradition: In dialogue with Borges, Paz, and Sarduy / Julia Kushigian. 1991
Between the self and the void: essays in honor of Severo Sarduy / Alicia Rivero Potter. 1998
Hispanic literature criticism. Supplement / Susan Salas., 1999
From Cuba with a Song.  Translated by Suzanne Jill Levine. Sun & Moon, 2000
Absolutely Postcolonial: Writing Between the Singular and the Specific / Peter Hallward. 2001
The review of contemporary fiction : Douglas Glover, Blaise Cendrars, Severo Sarduy / Rolando Pérez (Cuban poet). 2004
“Severo Sarduy (1937-93).” The encyclopedia of Caribbean literature. Vol. 2: M-Z. Ed. D.H. Figueredo. * 2006
Severo Sarduy and the Neo-Baroque Image of Thought in the Visual Arts. Rolando Pérez (Cuban poet). 2012.
Footwork: Selected Poems. Translated by David Francis. Contains poetry from Big Bang, Un testigo fugaz y disfrazado, Un testigo perenne y delatado and Últimos poemas. Circumference Books, 2021
Spanish
Severo Sarduy / Jorge Aguilar Mora. 1976
Severo Sarduy : el neobarroco de la transgresión / Adriana Méndez Rodenas. 1983
La temática novelística de Severo Sarduy : De dónde son los cantantes / José Sánchez-Boudy.1985
La estrategia neobarroca / Gustavo Guerrero. 1987
La ruta de Severo Sarduy / Roberto González Echevarría. 1987
Author/lector : Huidobro, Borges, Fuentes y Sarduy / Alicia Rivero Potter. 1991
Escrito sobre Severo : una relectura de Sarduy / Francisco Cabanillas. 1995
Severo Sarduy y Pedro Almodóvar : del barroco al kitsch en la narrativa y el cine postmodernos / Alejandro Varderi. 1996
La imagen y el cuerpo : Lezama y Sarduy / Virgilio López Lemus. 1997
Severo Sarduy : escrito sobre un rostro / Oneyda González. 2003
Severo Sarduy : alcances de una novelística y otros ensayos / Johan Gotera. 2005

External links

  Site dedicated to Severo Sarduy, A Media Voz.
  Small biographical description of Severo Sarduy with links to some of his texts, El Poder de la Palabra.
  Severo Sarduy: Los tatuajes emigrantes
François Wahl collection on Severo Sarduy at Princeton University Library Special Collections

Cuban LGBT dramatists and playwrights
Cuban LGBT poets
1937 births
1993 deaths
Cuban gay writers
AIDS-related deaths in France
Prix Médicis étranger winners
Gay dramatists and playwrights
Gay poets
École du Louvre alumni
20th-century Cuban poets
20th-century dramatists and playwrights
Male dramatists and playwrights
Cuban male poets
20th-century male writers
20th-century Cuban LGBT people